Africa Rural Connect (ARC) is a program of the National Peace Corps Association. The website was launched on July 15, 2009 as an online collaboration tool for users to share and build upon ideas to solve some of the challenges facing rural African communities. The ARC community features ideas and insight from returned and current U.S. Peace Corps Volunteers, members of the African Diaspora, development professionals, and academic scholars. ARC also encourages input from anyone who may have an interests or skill-sets that coincide with the ideas posted on the site. ARC is also holding a competition, offering funding to implement the best projects on the site. The second Africa Rural Connect Competition launched on March 15, 2010 and will run until November 15, 2010.

Technology
Africa Rural Connect runs on the Wegora platform. Like other, similar platforms, Wegora allows each user to post their idea onto the |website and to receive encouragement and advice in the form of comments on their idea page. However, Wegora also includes unique features, such as the ability of users to create improved versions of each other's ideas, clearly displaying how collaboration can transform a small idea into a full-out project plan. Also, users can "endorse" any idea in order to show their support of the suggested initiative.

Ideas
The site features ideas that aim to improve rural communities in Africa. There are four primary categories in which most ideas fall into: Agribusiness, Communication, Post-Harvest Losses, and Water Resources. Posts can range from one sentence ideas that prompt the creation of more detailed projects, to comprehensive business plans from established organizations.

Competition

2009
The ARC competition opened on July 15, 2009, when the site launched, and will close on November 15, 2009. There are 4 month-long preliminary rounds in the competition. The top 3 ideas in each round receive seed funding to implement their plans, first place receives $3,000, second place receives $2,000, and 3rd place receives $1,000. At the close of the fourth round, ARC judges will deliberate over the ideas, selecting the final winner in December 2009. The grand prize winner will receive $20,000 of project seed funds.

2010
The newest ARC competition launched on March 15, 2010 and will close on November 15, 2010. This time there will be four two-month-long rounds in the contest. The top 10 ideas in each round will become Round Winners. The judges will select the 2 best ideas based on how well the plans meet the selection criteria. These 2 winners will receive $1,000 each towards implementation. At the end of the fourth and final round, the competition will close and the panel of judges will select one Grand Prize Winner from all of the ideas posted on the site during the four rounds. This Grand Prize Winner will be selected by merit-based criteria and will receive $12,000 towards the implementation of the idea. We will announce the Grand Prize Winner in early December.

The First Round will run from March 15- May 15.

The Second Round will run from May 15- July 15.

The Third Round will run from July 15- September 15.

Fourth Round will run from September 15- November 15.

The 2010 Grand Prize winner was announced on December 28, 2010. The $12,000 prize went to a Ugandan Innovator, co-founder and Executive Director of Toro Development Network (ToroDev), Johnstone Baguma Kumaraki. The winner is also partners at Business Incubation Initiative, Uganda.

Judges

2009
Four judges will select the final Grand Prize Winner in December 2009:
 Carol Bellamy, President and CEO, World Learning, former Director of the Peace Corps, and former Executive Director of UNICEF
 Wilber James, manager of Rockport Capital, a leading venture capital firm and director of the African Wildlife Foundation
 Angélique Kidjo, world-renowned Beninoise singer-songwriter and UNICEF goodwill ambassador.
 Bruce McNamer, CEO of TechnoServe

2010
Three judges will select 2 prize winners out of the top 10 ideas of each round. They will also select the final Grand Prize Winner in December 2010:
 Wilber James, manager of Rockport Capital, a leading venture capital firm and director of the African Wildlife Foundation.
 Mariéme Jamme, CEO, SpotOne Global Solutions.
 Bruce McNamer, CEO of TechnoServe.

Funding and Support
ARC is hosted by the National Peace Corps Association, a non-profit, membership-based alumni organization that serves all returned Peace Corps volunteers and former staff, as well as Peace Corps family, friends, and supporters. The project is supported by a grant from the Bill & Melinda Gates Foundation as part of the foundation's Agricultural Development initiative to provide millions of small-holder farmers in the developing world with tools and opportunities to boost their yields, increase their incomes, and build better lives for themselves and their families.

References

External links 

 

Peace Corps